The Right Stuff or Right Stuff may refer to:

Books
 The Right Stuff (book) (1979), by Tom Wolfe about the U.S. manned space program

Film and TV
 The Right Stuff (film) (1983), based on the book
 "The Right Stuff" (House) (2007), episode in the American series
 The Right Stuff (TV series) (2020), based on the book

Media
 The Right Stuff (blog), a neo-Nazi and white supremacist media outlet and blog
 Right Stuff (company), 1990s Japanese video-game company
 Right Stuf Inc., Western distributor of anime and other Asian video media
 The Right Stuff (dating web site)
 The Right Stuff (dating app), a dating app for American conservatives

Music 
 The Right Stuff Records, a record label

Albums
 The Right Stuff (album), by Vanessa Williams, 1988
 The Right Stuff, by Stuff, 1996

Songs
 "The Right Stuff" (Bryan Ferry song), 1987
 "The Right Stuff" (Vanessa Williams song), 1988
 "You Got It (The Right Stuff)", by New Kids on the Block, 1988
 "The Right Stuff", by Noel Gallagher's High Flying Birds from Chasing Yesterday, 2015
 "The Right Stuff", by Robert Calvert from Captain Lockheed and the Starfighters, 1974

See also
 The Wright Stuff, a British television chat show
 The Write Stuff, a British radio quiz programme